Martin Lundström (30 May 1918 – 30 June 2016) was a Swedish cross-country skier who competed in the late 1940s and early 1950s. He was born in Tvärliden, Norsjö Municipality.

Lundström won two Olympic gold medals during the 1948 Winter Olympics in Saint-Moritz, Switzerland at the 18 km and 4 × 10 km relay events. He also won a bronze medal in the 4 × 10 km relay at the 1952 Winter Olympics. Lundström also won at the 18 km event at the Holmenkollen ski festival in 1948. Additionally, he won a gold in the 4 × 10 km relay at the 1950 FIS Nordic World Ski Championships. He died in June 2016 at the age of 98.

Cross-country skiing results
All results are sourced from the International Ski Federation (FIS).

Olympic Games
 3 medals – (2 gold, 1 bronze)

World Championships
 1 medal – (1 gold)

References

External links
 Profile with image
 
 
  - click Vinnere for downloadable pdf file 

1918 births
2016 deaths
People from Norsjö Municipality
Cross-country skiers from Västerbotten County
Swedish male cross-country skiers
Olympic cross-country skiers of Sweden
Cross-country skiers at the 1948 Winter Olympics
Cross-country skiers at the 1952 Winter Olympics
Olympic gold medalists for Sweden
Olympic bronze medalists for Sweden
Holmenkollen Ski Festival winners
Olympic medalists in cross-country skiing
FIS Nordic World Ski Championships medalists in cross-country skiing
Medalists at the 1948 Winter Olympics
Medalists at the 1952 Winter Olympics